Emma Victoria Jenkins (born 1993 in Llanelli, Wales) is a Welsh television presenter and beauty pageant titleholder who was crowned Miss Universe Great Britain 2019. She represented Great Britain at Miss Universe 2019.

Pageantry 
Emma Jenkins went to compete in Miss Wales 2015 and placed first. As Miss Wales, she represented Wales at Miss World 2015 where she finished unplaced.

Jenkins was a finalist at Miss Universe Great Britain 2017 but decided to withdraw from the competition. On 13 July 2019, she won the Miss Universe Great Britain 2019 competition at the Mercure Holland House in Cardiff, Wales and was crowned by outgoing titleholder Dee-Ann Kentish-Rogers.
She represented Great Britain in the Miss Universe 2019 competition and finished unplaced.

References

External links
Official website, MissUniverseGB.

1993 births
Living people
Miss World 2015 delegates
Miss Universe 2019 contestants
Welsh beauty pageant winners
Welsh television presenters
Welsh women television presenters
British beauty pageant winners
British television presenters
British women television presenters